HMS Godetia was an  sloop of the Royal Navy Fishery Protection Squadron. She was launched in 1916, had a deep load displacement of 1,350 tons, and was broken up in 1937.

For a short while she served in the Arctic, and on 9 May 1923 a trawler from Hull – the  – was seized by a Russian gunboat off the coast of Murmansk for alleged illegal fishing. The trawler was captured after Godetia returned briefly to Norway to re-coal and resupply. The Godetia was soon relieved by  under Captain Evans, commander of the fishery protection cruiser squadron.

References

Arabis-class sloops
1916 ships
Ships of the Fishery Protection Squadron of the United Kingdom